A by-election was held for the New South Wales Legislative Assembly seat of Cook's River on Saturday, 12 December 1959 and was triggered by the death in office of the Premier of New South Wales, Joseph Cahill.

The seat was subsequently retained for the Labor Party by his eldest son Tom. Despite Cook's River being a safe Labor seat, the Liberal Party fielded a candidate, John Bampton, a soap manufacturer. The Labor primary vote improved by 1.6% compared to the previous year's general election. The Communist Party of Australia stood Wal Buckley, an organiser for the Amalgamated Engineering Union, but only gained 4.6% of the vote.

Results

Joseph Cahill died. The Labor Party retained the seat on an improved margin, which was nonetheless significant due to the large personal vote for Cahill and sympathy after his death which was then carried by his son.

See also
Electoral results for the district of Cook's River
List of New South Wales state by-elections

References

New South Wales state by-elections
1959 elections in Australia
1950s in New South Wales